Myx Music Awards 2018 was the 13th installment of the Myx Music Awards, acknowledging the biggest hit makers of 2017 in the Philippine music industry. For the seventh consecutive year, fans could vote online through the Myx website.

Nominees were announced on February 28, 2018 starting at 12nn via Facebook Live streaming. Leading the nominees were Jona, James Reid and Sarah Geronimo with five nominations, each.

It may have been noticed that the category names were changed this year replacing the word Favorite into of the year. This year also marks the return of Favorite MYX Bandarito Performance category which was last included in 2010.

For the first time in history of the awards, Twitter Philippines given MYX Music Awards 2018 an exclusive emoji for using hashtags #MYXMusicAwards2018 and #MMAs2018. On May 6, 2018, the popular streaming service, Spotify made an exclusive playlist of songs nominated on the awards.

The awards night was held on May 15, 2018 at the Smart Araneta Coliseum. The very first MYX Squadfest was also held on the venue as a pre-programming for the main award show.

Winners and nominees
Winners are listed first and highlighted in boldface.

Multiple awards

Artists with multiple wins
The following artists received two or more awards:

Artists with multiple nominations
The following artists received more than two nominations:

References

External links
 MYX Official Site

Myx Music Awards
2018 music awards
Philippine music awards